Starfucker is the name of an indie-electronica band from Portland, Oregon.

Starfucker may also refer to:
 Starfucker (album), an album by the band
 "Star Star", song originally named "Starfucker" on the 1973 album Goats Head Soup by The Rolling Stones
 "Starfuckers, Inc.", song by Nine Inch Nails
 "Starfucker", a song by Willam Belli from The Wreckoning
  Starfuckers, Italian rock band